Clyde Halemaumau "Kindy" Sproat (November 21, 1930 – December 15, 2008) was a Hawaiian falsetto musician.

Sproat was born in Honokane Iki, North Kohala, Hawaii and died in Hawaii.

He was a recipient of a 1988 National Heritage Fellowship awarded by the National Endowment for the Arts, which is the United States government's highest honor in the folk and traditional arts.

References

External links

Virtual Festivals: Clyde Sproat

1930 births
2008 deaths
20th-century American musicians
National Heritage Fellowship winners
Singers from Hawaii
20th-century American singers
Native Hawaiian musicians
People from Hawaii (island)